Sipah-e-Sahaba Pakistan (SSP, Guardians of the Prophet's Companions), renamed to Millat-e-Islamia, is a Islamist organisation in Pakistan, which also functioned as a political party. It broke away from the main Deobandi Sunni organisation Jamiatul Ulema-e-Islam in 1985. Established in Jhang by Haq Nawaz Jhangvi, it was banned by President Pervez Musharraf in 2002 as a terrorist organization under the Anti-Terrorism Act of 1997. In March 2012, the government of Pakistan banned Sipah-e-Sahaba again. The government of the United Kingdom banned the group earlier in 2001.

On 26 June 2018, before that year’s election, the Government of Pakistan lifted the ban on Sipah-e-Sahaba Pakistan. Many Incident causes On August 2019 Sabzazar Lahore Division Leader Hafiz Owais Akram was criticized for doing social work against them and then acquitted him of high support.

Their main current front is the Pakistan Rah-e-Haq Party, which they contested the 2018 general elections with and the 2020 Gilgit-Baltistan Assembly elections with.

History

Sipah-e-Sahaba Pakistan was formed in 1985 by Haq Nawaz Jhangvi, Zia ur Rehman Farooqi, Isar-ul-Haq Qasmi and Azam Tariq in 1985 originally as Anjuman Sipah-e-Sahaba in Jhang, Pakistan. The original purpose was to fight Shi'ite landlords dominance in Jhang and surrounding areas in a majority Sunni population. Later, they became violent and started to attack Shi'ite Muslims. From 1980s, they are involved in various terrorist activities and murder of thousands of Shi'ites. They are operating all over Pakistan and are politically active having large vote bank in Punjab and Khyber Pakhtunkhwa (KP). They are widely organized and have more than five hundred offices throughout country.

In 1996, many left the group and formed another organization Lashkar-e-Jhangvi (LeJ).

In 2002, Pervez Musharraf government declared the group as terrorist organization and was banned. However, later, they renamed it and launched it under the name of Millat-e-Islamia Pakistan. They were again banned in 2003. After the death of Azam Tariq, Muhammad Ahmed Ludhianvi was selected as the president.

A leader of Sipah-e-Sahaba was a minister in the coalition Government in Punjab in 1993 and the group has held seats in the Pakistan National Assembly.

When Jhangvi was assassinated in 1990 by presumed Shi'a militants, Zia ur Rehman Farooqi assumed leadership of the group. Zia ur Rehman Farooqi died in a bomb explosion on 19 January 1997 at the Lahore Session Court. After his death, Azam Tariq led the group until October 2003, when he was also killed in an attack widely attributed to the militant Shi'a organization Sipah-e-Muhammad, along with four others.

Its leader (sarparast-aala), Ali Sher Haideri, was killed in an ambush in 2009. Then Muhammad Ahmed Ludhianvi was selected as sarparast-e-aala with Aurangzaib Farooqi as the president of the organization.

Strength
The organization has 500 offices and branches in all provinces of Pakistan including Kashmir and Gilgit-Baltistan. It also has approximately 300,000 registered workers in Pakistan and 17 branches in countries including the United Arab Emirates, Saudi Arabia, Bangladesh, Canada and the United Kingdom.

Its regular publications include the monthlies Khilafat-e-Rashida, Aab-e-Hayat and Genius.

Affiliations

In 1996 elements within the Sipah-e-Sahaba who did not believe the organisation violent enough left to form the Lashkar-e-Jhangvi.
In October 2000, Masood Azhar, founder of the banned Jaish-e-Mohammed, was quoted as saying that "Sipah-e-Sahaba stands shoulder to shoulder with Jaish-e-Muhammad in Jihad."  A leaked U.S. diplomatic cable described it as "another Sipah-e-Sahaba breakaway Deobandi organisation."
A diplomatic cable, originally dated 23 October 2009 and later leaked to the media, from the U.S. embassy in Islamabad indicated that Qari Hussain, a leading militant of the Tehrik-i-Taliban Pakistan, had roots in the defunct Sipah-e-Sahaba and that many of the Taliban's foot soldiers are from Sipah-e-Sahaba ranks.
 According to Animesh Roul, Ahle-Sunnat-Wal-Jamat is a front group for SSP, and is also banned in Pakistan.

See also 
 List of Deobandi organisations
Anti-Shi'ism
Genocide of Kashmiri Shias
Madhe Sahaba Agitation
Persecution of Hazara people
Persecution of Shias by ISIL
Syed Ahmad Barelvi

References

Violence against Shia Muslims in Pakistan
Organisations designated as terrorist by Pakistan
Organisations designated as terrorist by the United Kingdom
Anti-Shi'ism
1985 establishments in Pakistan
Deobandi organisations
Sipah-e-Sahaba Pakistan
Lashkar-e-Jhangvi